is a Japanese politician of the Liberal Democratic Party, a member of the House of Councillors in the Diet (national legislature). He was elected to the House of Councillors for the first time in 2007 after serving in the assembly of Ibaraki Prefecture.

References

External links 
 Official website in Japanese.

1943 births
Living people
Members of the House of Councillors (Japan)
Liberal Democratic Party (Japan) politicians
Hosei University alumni